Primo Reggiani (born 5 November 1983) is an Italian actor. Born in Rome to Tuscan actor Aldo Reggiani and Apulian actress, Caterina Costantini, he appeared in more than thirty films since 1996.

Selected filmography

Film

Television

References

External links 

1983 births
Living people
Italian male film actors
People of Tuscan descent
People of Apulian descent